Neusa Vale is a rural locality in the Gympie Region, Queensland, Australia. In the  Neusa Vale had a population of 52 people.

History 
Neusa Vale Provisional School opened on 14 August 1899. In 1906 it was renamed Wolvi Provisional School. On 1 January 1909 it became Wolvi State School.

Neusavale State School opened on 18 September 1933. It closed in 1962. It was located at 643 Neusavale Road.

In the  Neusa Vale had a population of 52 people.

References 

Gympie Region
Localities in Queensland